Sliced fish soup is a dish in Singapore, believed to have originated from the Teochews. It consists of fish, vegetables, and beancurd; with the addition of cuttlefish and prawns, the dish is called seafood soup. It is sold in most hawker centres and usually costs between SGD 3.50 and SGD 5.

See also
 List of soups

References

Fish and seafood soups
Singaporean cuisine
Sliced foods